Inga laurina is a species of plant in the family Fabaceæ. It is found from Mexico south to Argentina. The species is present throughout most of Brazil, where it is called ingá-mirim (small ice-cream-bean) due to the relatively small pods.

References

External links

laurina
Trees of Mexico
Trees of Argentina
Trees of Peru